Arthur Griffin Claypole (1882–1929) FRCO LTCL was a cathedral organist, who served in Derby Cathedral.

Background
Arthur Claypole was born in 1882 in Peterborough. He graduated from Durham University as Bachelor of Music in 1902.

He studied organ under Haydn Keeton at Peterborough Cathedral and at the University of Music and Theatre Leipzig. He was awarded his Fellowship of the Royal College of Organists in 1903.

He was Music Master at Kent College in Canterbury from 1904 to 1911.

He then took the post of head teacher at Derby School of Music from 1921-1929.

He was on holiday in Leipzig in 1914 when the First World War broke out, and he was detained until after the Armistice.

Whilst organist of Derby Cathedral he was also conductor of the Derby Orpheus Society.

He died of coal gas poisoning following a nervous breakdown.

Career
Assistant Organist of:
Peterborough Cathedral (1902–1903)

Organist of:
St. Luke's Church, Derby (1912–1914 and 1918–1921)
Derby Cathedral (1921–1929)

References

1882 births
1929 deaths
English classical organists
British male organists
Cathedral organists
Fellows of the Royal College of Organists
Alumni of Durham University
Suicides by gas
20th-century organists
20th-century British male musicians
20th-century classical musicians
Male classical organists